Bertha Clay McNeill (November 12, 1887 – September 21, 1979) was an American civil rights activist, peace activist, and educator. She grew up in North Carolina and earned a teaching certificate there before moving to Washington, D.C. where she studied at Howard University. During her schooling, she became a member of Alpha Kappa Alpha Sorority and the Howard University Women's Club. On graduating in 1908, she briefly taught in Baltimore, before transferring to the District of Columbia Public School System. From 1909 to 1916, she taught at the M Street High School, thereafter at Dunbar High School until 1957, when she became an adjunct professor at Howard. During her teaching career, McNeill was the faculty advisor for Dunbar High School's student newspaper, edited several journals for organizations, and contributed articles to African-American newspapers.

One of the few Black activists who were members of the Women's International League for Peace and Freedom (WILPF), McNeill joined the organization in 1934. The following year, she became chair of its Interracial Committee, later renamed the Committee on Minorities and Race Relations, where she pressed for  diversification of membership and recognition of civil rights issues as part of the peace movement. She led the organization to oppose lynching and Jim Crow laws and to adopt policies against scheduling meetings and congresses in segregated facilities while actively supporting school desegregation. She also chaired the Committee on Special Problems of Branches, which was responsible for handling accusations against WILPF and its members under McCarthyism. She served as a national vice president of the US branch of WILPF for at least five terms and represented the national organization as a delegate at four international congresses. In 1954, she became the chair of the Washington, D.C. WILPF section and served in that capacity until 1960. McNeill remained active in the WILPF until her death in 1979.

Early life and education
Bertha Clay McNeill was born on November 12, 1887 in Southport, North Carolina, to Lucy Alice (née Reaves) and Henry Clay McNeill. She was the youngest child in the family which included three sons and four daughters – William, Luther, Oliver, Beulah, Mary, Elizabeth, and Bertha. Henry was a farmer, who worked in North Carolina and Maryland before retiring to Washington, D. C. Bertha attended the Gregory Normal Institute of Wilmington, North Carolina, the first school established in the city that could legally educate Black students. After graduating, she moved to Washington, D.C. in 1905, and furthered her education at Howard University, one of the Black colleges established shortly after the end of American Civil War. She was a member of Alpha Kappa Alpha Sorority, the first Black women's intercollegiate sorority in the United States, which formed in 1908 at Howard, and a charter member of the Howard University Women's Club.

Career

Teaching (1908–1961)
On graduating from Howard in 1908 with a Bachelor of Arts degree, McNeill began working at the Colored High and Training School in Baltimore, Maryland. She was hired by the District of Columbia Public School System in 1909, teaching a second grade class until she was transferred to the M Street High School. The first public secondary school for Blacks in Washington, D.C., from 1916 it was renamed Dunbar High School. During her tenure as an English and journalism teacher at the school, McNeill continued her education, taking courses at Columbia University, the University of Chicago, and the Catholic University of America, where she earned a master's degree in 1950. After retiring from Dunbar in 1957, she taught as an adjunct professor of English and reading at Howard University for four years.

Journalism (1916–1969)
McNeill was the faculty advisor to Dunbar High School's student newspaper, the Dunbar Advisor. She also wrote articles for the Cape Fear Journal, an African-American newspaper which was founded by her sister Mary's husband, Robert S. Jervay, in 1927. She encouraged her nephew Robert H. McNeill, son of her brother William, to pursue his interest in photojournalism and bought him his first camera. McNeill was editor of the journal of the National Association of College Women, the journal of the US national WILPF section, and also the Lincoln Reporter, a church newspaper of the Lincoln Temple United Church of Christ. From 1964 to 1969, she wrote a regular column for the Wilmington Journal, whose editor at the time was her nephew, Thomas C. Jervay.

Activism (1910–1960s)
In 1910, McNeill, along with women educators including Sara W. Brown, Mary Cromwell, Georgiana Simpson, and Mary Church Terrell, founded the College Alumnae Club, known from  April 1923 as the National Association of College Women. That year, McNeill became president of the organization, succeeding Lucy M. Holmes. She was also a member of the League for Industrial Democracy and the Women's Trade Union League. Her activism within various organizations often overlapped, as for example when she fought women having to register for the draft along with her sorority sisters from Alpha Kappa Alpha and other organizations. As chair of the Committee on Public Affairs for the National Association of College Women, she formally wrote to the National Education Association to protest their selection of convention locations that would not allow Black attendees to lodge and required separate food, elevator, entrance, and seating arrangements. She was particularly concerned that although, for example in the Austin-Wadsworth Bill, service placement was proposed to be based on aptitude, racially discriminatory hiring policies would in fact prevent hiring for Black women based on their skills. While staunchly against the war, McNeill noted that the African American community could better contribute to the war effort if policies allowed them equal hiring opportunities and merit-based pay.

Although the Women's International League for Peace and Freedom (WILPF) was predominantly an international organization of White women with only about one percent of its membership being women of color, McNeill joined the organization in 1934, at the invitation of Addie Waites Hunton. Since 1928, the WILPF had an Interracial Committee, which was tasked with increasing the numbers of elite women of color in the organization and eliminating the early policy of segregation that had caused the loss of early members such as Mary Church Terrell. The committee was headed by Hunton until she resigned in 1935 and was replaced by McNeill. McNeill pointed out early in her tenure that while Black women were allowed to serve at the national level, in state and local organizations, they were often limited to membership of the Interracial Committee, rather than WILPF itself. Although the national organization set policy, state and local organizations had broad autonomy. In 1937, McNeill, who had been elected to serve on the national WILPF Board, proposed that the non-national Interracial Committees be dissolved because they were used by some chapters to prevent racial integration and cooperation, and in some instances did not allow Black women to join WILPF. Her position was not accepted until 1941, when the Interracial Committees were disbanded and replaced with a national Committee on Minorities and Race Relations.

Despite the internal conflicts, McNeill was committed to recruiting new Black members, and in 1938 introduced Vera Chandler Foster, who  organized a WILPF branch in Tuskegee, Alabama, and Lucy Diggs Slowe. She also pushed for WILPF's support of anti-lynching legislation and elimination of Jim Crow laws. She actively campaigned against conventions being held at hotels that did not allow Black delegates to stay in their facilities. McNeill served as a delegate from the United States to the Ninth International WILPF Congress held in Luhačovice, Czechoslovakia in 1937. She was still giving lectures on peace to various women's groups at the end of the 1950s and remained active in WILPF throughout the 1960s and 1970s.

Death and legacy
McNeill died on September 21, 1979, at the Wisconsin Avenue Nursing Home from arteriosclerosis. She is remembered as an influential member of the peace movement and a leader whose activism linked peace to freedom, as well as economic and civic justice. A chapter on her life is included in the Notable American Women: A Biographical Dictionary Completing the Twentieth Century. This was the fifth volume in the series and was edited by historian Susan Ware, assisted by Stacy Braukman. The women who were included had to have died prior to 2000, and known for being influential or for contributing to pioneering or innovative work in their era. Some of McNeill's papers are housed in the Robert H. McNeill family collection at the Library of Congress, while some of those related to her WILPF activities are located in the Swarthmore College Peace Collection.

Notes

References

Citations

Bibliography
 

 

1887 births
1979 deaths
People from Southport, North Carolina
Howard University alumni
Catholic University of America alumni
American pacifists
American women's rights activists
American civil rights activists
Women's International League for Peace and Freedom people
20th-century African-American educators
20th-century African-American women
American women activists
Activists from North Carolina
Activists from Washington, D.C.
Schoolteachers from Washington, D.C.
Schoolteachers from North Carolina